Cytochrome c reductase may refer to:
 Coenzyme Q – cytochrome c reductase, an enzyme
 NADH dehydrogenase, an enzyme